The 9th PTC Punjabi Film Awards ceremony, presented by PTC Punjabi, honored the best Punjabi films of 2018, and took place at JLPL Ground, Mohali on 16 March 2019. The ceremony is conducted by Sonu Sood, Divya Dutta, Manish Paul, Gavy Chahal and Gurnam Bhullar.

Winners 

Winners are listed first, highlighted in boldface, and indicated with a double dagger.

Nominees 
Below are the category-wise nomination list.

References 

2019 film awards